= Johann Martin Veith =

Swiss painter (1650–1717)

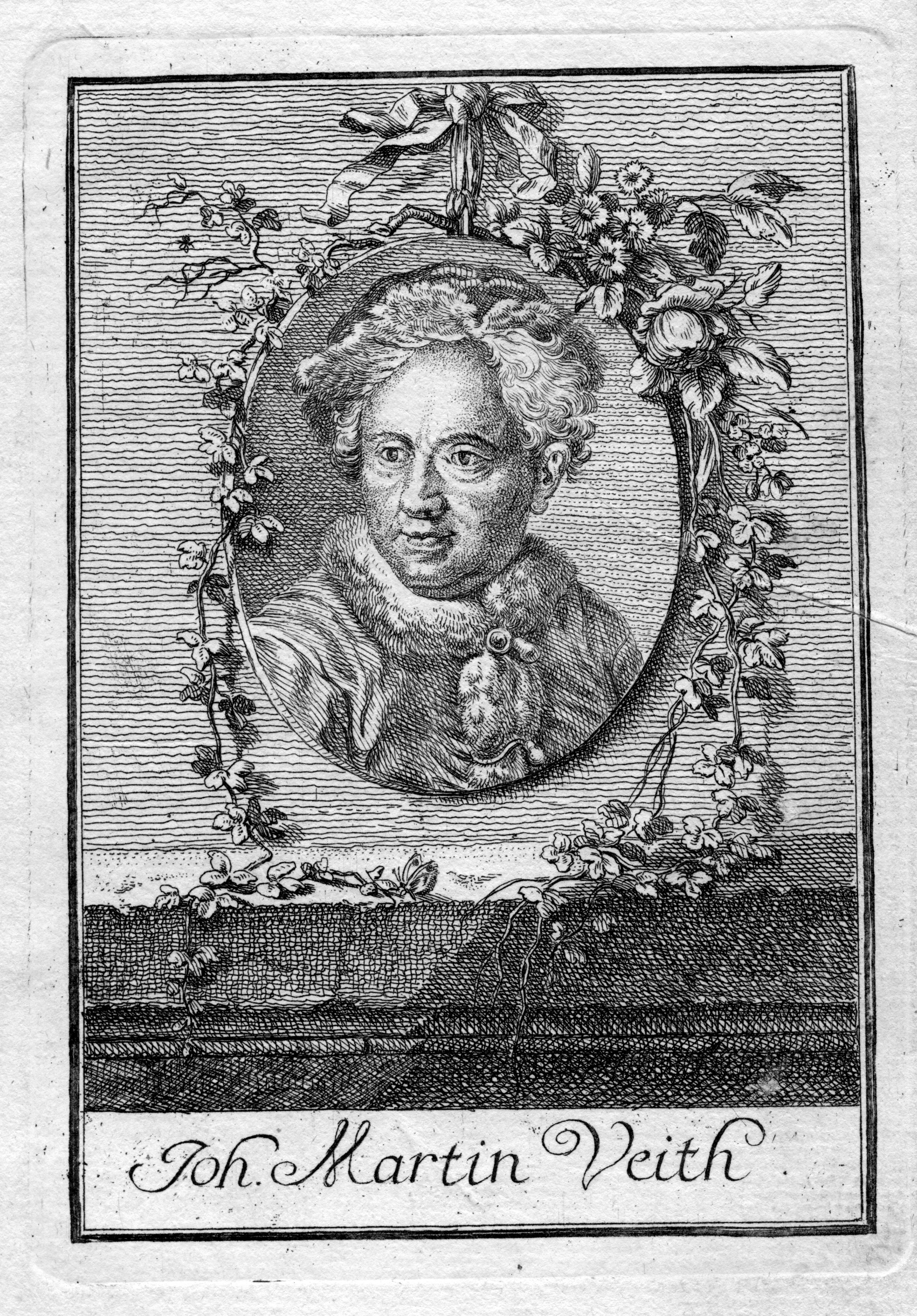
- Born: Johann Martin Veith; 9 May 1650; Schaffhausen, Switzerland
- Died: 14 April 1717 (aged 67); Schaffhausen, Switzerland
- Known for: Painting
- Movement: Baroque

Johann Martin Veith (9 May 1650 – 14 April 1717) was a Swiss painter in the Baroque style, known for historical, Biblical and mythological scenes.

== Life and work ==
Johann Martin Veith studied art in Rome and Venice for ten years, after which he went with the Prince Radziwiłł to Warsaw, where he worked for two years. Upon his return to Schaffhausen he painted portraits of prominent people as well as scenes from mythology and history in the Venetian style.
